Telapristone, as telapristone acetate (proposed brand names Proellex, Progenta; former code name CDB-4124), is a synthetic, steroidal selective progesterone receptor modulator (SPRM) related to mifepristone which is under development by Repros Therapeutics for the treatment of breast cancer, endometriosis, and uterine fibroids. It was originally developed by the National Institutes of Health (NIH), and, as of 2017, is in phase II clinical trials for the aforementioned indications. In addition to its activity as an SPRM, the drug also has some antiglucocorticoid activity.

See also
 List of investigational sex-hormonal agents § Progestogenics
 Aglepristone
 Lilopristone
 Onapristone
 Toripristone

References

External links
 Telapristone - AdisInsight

Acetate esters
Dimethylamino compounds
Antiglucocorticoids
Estranes
Ketones
Selective progesterone receptor modulators